is a very small near-Earth asteroid and potentially hazardous object of the Apollo group, approximately  in diameter.

Orbit and classification 

 is a member of the Apollo group of asteroids, which are Earth-crossing asteroids. They are the largest group of near-Earth objects with approximately 10,000 known members. It orbits the Sun at a distance of 0.91–1.29 AU once every 14 months (424 days; semi-major axis of 1.1 AU). Its orbit has an eccentricity of 0.18 and an inclination of 1° with respect to the ecliptic.

The body's observation arc begins with its first observation by the Mount Lemmon Survey on 31 March 2019, just a few days prior to its potential discovery observation by the Catalina Sky Survey.

Physical characteristics

Diameter and albedo 

Based on an magnitude-to-diameter conversion and a measured absolute magnitude of 26.5,  measures between 15 and 28 meters in diameter for an assumed geometric albedo of 0.20 (siliceous) and 0.057 (carbonaceous), respectively.

References

External links 
 CSS Observer Africano Discovers 2019’s Closest Earth-Grazing Asteroid, Catalina Sky Survey, 17 April 2019
 
 
 

Minor planet object articles (unnumbered)
Discoveries by the Catalina Sky Survey
20190409
20190409